Jaeda Daniel is an American tennis player.

Daniel currently plays college tennis at North Carolina State. In 2022 Daniel and doubles partner Nell Miller became the first NC State players to win the NCAA Division I Women's Doubles Championship.

Daniels earned All-American honors in both singles and doubles in 2022, and was named the 2022 ITA Most Improved Senior

ITF Finals

Singles: 2 runner–ups

Doubles: 3 runner–ups

External links

References

Living people
American female tennis players
21st-century American women
NC State Wolfpack women's tennis players
Year of birth missing (living people)
Tennis people from Pennsylvania